Séamus Downey (born 13 June 1960) is a former cyclist from Northern Ireland. He competed in the individual road race event at the 1984 Summer Olympics for Ireland.

References

External links
 

1960 births
Living people
Cyclists from Northern Ireland
Olympic cyclists of Ireland
Cyclists at the 1984 Summer Olympics
Place of birth missing (living people)